The coats of arms, flags, and badges of the House of Lusignan, royal family in the Levant during the Crusades.

First House of Lusignan
Including attributed arms.

French Nobility

Cognac

Lezay

Vouvant

Issoudun

Rochefoucauld

Parthenay

English Nobility

Valence

Hastings

Jerusalem Royal Family

Royal Family of Jerusalem and Cyprus

Second House of Lusignan

Royal Family of Jerusalem, Cyprus, and Armenia

Flags

Symbols

Roses, lions, dragons and mermaids were Lusignan symbols and heraldic elements.

References

Lusignan
Lusignan